Wat Mahathat Yuwaratrangsarit is a Buddhist temple in Bangkok, Thailand. It is one of the ten royal temples of the highest class in Bangkok.

History
Built during the Ayutthaya period (1351–1767), the temple was then known as Wat Salak. Soon after Bangkok was established as the capital of Siam, the temple became strategically situated between the newly built Grand Palace and Front Palace (residence of the vice-king). As a result, the temple was used for royal ceremonies and funerals.

Throughout the past two centuries, the temple has been renovated and elevated in status by many Thai kings and royalties. It became the Wat Mahathat of Bangkok in 1803 and was given its current name in 1996. The temple is also home to Vipassana Meditation centre.

University
Mahachulalongkornrajavidyalaya University, Thailand's oldest higher education institute for Buddhist monks, is on the temple grounds.  This is one of the most important universities in Thailand, split into faculty of human sciences, social sciences, an international programme, and a graduate college.  The first class was admitted in 1889 and by 1997, both universities became public universities.

Media

Notes

References

External links 

 Wat Mahathat Yuwarajarangsarit Rajaworamahavihara (Dhammathai)
 Wat Mahathat Yuwarajarangsarit Rajaworamahavihara (Bangkok Tourist)

Mahathat
Phra Nakhon district
Thai Theravada Buddhist temples and monasteries
Registered ancient monuments in Bangkok